George Hastings, 1st Earl of Huntingdon, KB (148824 March 1544) was an English nobleman.

Family
George Hastings, born in 1488 at Ashby-de-la-Zouch, was the son of Edward Hastings, 2nd Baron Hastings, and Mary Hungerford, daughter and heiress of Sir Thomas Hungerford of Rowden, Wiltshire, by Anne Percy, daughter of Henry Percy, 2nd Earl of Northumberland, and Eleanor Neville, daughter of Ralph Neville, 1st Earl of Westmorland.

Career
Hastings was created a Knight of the Bath in November 1501, and succeeded to his father's title between 4 and 15 November 1506. In 1513 he served with King Henry VIII's army in France, and was present when both Therouanne and Tournai were taken by the English forces. He was present at the 1520 meeting between Henry VIII and Francis I of France now known as Field of the Cloth of Gold and when Charles V, Holy Roman Emperor visited England in 1522.

He was created Earl of Huntingdon on 8 December 1529. On the same day his eldest son, Francis, gained a seat at the so-called Reformation Parliament. In 1536 he held a command in the forces which put down the rebellion called the Pilgrimage of Grace.

Huntingdon was a close friend of the King. His wife, Anne, was the King's mistress in 1510, and possibly until 1513; she later had a close relationship with another of her husband's friends, the courtier and soldier William Compton.

Marriage and issue
George Hastings married, about December 1509, Anne Stafford, widow of Sir Walter Herbert (died 16 December 1507). She was the daughter of Henry Stafford, 2nd Duke of Buckingham, and Katherine Woodville, the daughter of Richard Woodville, 1st Earl Rivers, by Jacquetta of Luxembourg, daughter of Pierre de Luxembourg, Count of St. Pol.

George Hastings and Anne Stafford had five sons and three daughters:

Francis Hastings, 2nd Earl of Huntingdon (151425 January 1569). Father of both Henry Hastings, 3rd Earl of Huntingdon and George Hastings, 4th Earl of Huntingdon.
Sir Thomas Hastings. Married Winifred Pole, daughter of Henry Pole, 1st Baron Montagu and Jane Neville. Jane was a daughter of George Nevill, 5th Baron Bergavenny and his wife Margaret, daughter of Hugh Fenn.
Edward Hastings, 1st Baron Hastings of Loughborough.
Henry Hastings.
William Hastings.
Dorothy Hastings, who married Sir Richard Devereux, a son of Walter Devereux, 1st Viscount Hereford. They were parents of Walter Devereux, 1st Earl of Essex.
Mary Hastings, who married Thomas Berkeley, 6th Baron Berkeley.
Katherine Hastings.

Ancestry

Notes

References

External links
George Hastings ~ Tudorplace.com

|-

|-

1544 deaths
1488 births
Knights of the Bath
People from Ashby-de-la-Zouch
Year of birth unknown
16th-century English nobility
15th-century English people
George Hastings, 1st Earl of Huntingdon
1
Barons Hastings
Barons Botreaux
Barons Hungerford